Bounnhang Vorachit (born 15 August 1938) is a Laotian politician. He was previously General Secretary of the Lao People's Revolutionary Party and President of Laos from 2016 to 2021.

Early life
Bounnhang Vorachit joined the Pathet Lao resistance movement in 1951 and worked in the propaganda department of the armed forces in Savannakhet. In 1956, he was transferred to the fighting troops. He studied in Vietnam from 1958 to 1961, then returned to Laos to help prepare for the conquest of Luang Namtha Province. After the victory in Luang Namtha in 1962, he returned to Vietnam and studied at a military college.

In 1964, he returned to Laos and in 1969, became head of the organizing committee of the province Xieng Khuang. In 1972, he became Deputy Commander of the Northern Front in Luang Prabang Province. Here he also joined the coalition in 1974 and became party secretary of the defence forces of the neutral city Luang Prabang. In 1976 he became political leader of the armed forces of the northern half of the country. In 1978, he returned to Vietnam to study political theory. In 1981, he became political leader of the armed forces, and in the same year up to 1991, he also worked as Governor of Savannakhet Province until 1996, when he became Deputy Prime Minister.

Political career
Prior to becoming Prime Minister in 2001, he served as Deputy Prime Minister since 1996. In addition, he was from 1996 to 1999 Chairman of the Lao-Vietnamese Cooperation Committee and from 1999 to 2001 Minister of Finance. On 26 March 2001, he was elected Chairman of the Council of Ministers (Prime Minister) of Laos. On 8 June 2006, he was followed by the former 1st Deputy Prime Minister Bouasone Bouphavanh in the office of Prime Minister. He himself became vice-president of the Democratic People's Republic of Laos on March 8, 2006 and thus deputy to Choummaly Sayasone.

Bounnhang's ties with Vietnam run deep. He underwent military training there and, after taking part in founding the Lao People's Democratic Republic in 1975, he studied socialist thought there.

He became Vice President on 8 June 2006, when Bouasone Bouphavanh was appointed as Prime Minister. At the 10th Congress of the Lao People's Revolutionary Party, he was elected to succeed Choummaly Sayasone as General Secretary on 22 January 2016, effectively making him the leader of Laos.
Bounnhang Vorachit is married to Khammeung Vorachit and is the father of three sons and two daughters. One of his daughters, Bounkham Vorachit, was elected to the 11th LPRP Central Committee.

At the 11th congress of the Lao People's Revolutionary Party (2021), he stepped down as General Secretary in favor of Thongloun Sisoulith.

References

External links 
Biography courtesy of Burmese Government

|-

|-

|-

|-

1938 births
Heads of the Central Committee of the Lao People's Revolutionary Party
Members of the 3rd Central Committee of the Lao People's Revolutionary Party
Members of the 4th Central Committee of the Lao People's Revolutionary Party
Members of the 5th Central Committee of the Lao People's Revolutionary Party
Members of the 6th Central Committee of the Lao People's Revolutionary Party
Members of the 7th Central Committee of the Lao People's Revolutionary Party
Members of the 8th Central Committee of the Lao People's Revolutionary Party
Members of the 9th Central Committee of the Lao People's Revolutionary Party
Members of the 10th Central Committee of the Lao People's Revolutionary Party
Members of the 6th Politburo of the Lao People's Revolutionary Party
Members of the 7th Politburo of the Lao People's Revolutionary Party
Members of the 8th Politburo of the Lao People's Revolutionary Party
Members of the 9th Politburo of the Lao People's Revolutionary Party
Members of the 10th Politburo of the Lao People's Revolutionary Party
Members of the 8th Executive Committee of the Lao People's Revolutionary Party
Members of the 9th Secretariat of the Lao People's Revolutionary Party
Members of the 10th Secretariat of the Lao People's Revolutionary Party
Lao People's Revolutionary Party politicians
Living people
People from Savannakhet province
Prime Ministers of Laos
Presidents of Laos
Vice presidents of Laos
Finance Ministers of Laos
Deputy Prime Ministers of Laos